Sabahattin Kuruoğlu (1937 – 7 December 1995) was a Turkish footballer. He played in nine matches for the Turkey national football team from 1961 to 1965.

References

1937 births
1995 deaths
Turkish footballers
Turkey international footballers
Place of birth missing
Association footballers not categorized by position